The purple indigobird (Vidua purpurascens) is a species of bird in the family Viduidae. It is also known as the dusky indigobird, a name which can refer to Vidua funerea. It is found in Angola, Botswana, Democratic Republic of the Congo, Kenya, Malawi, Mozambique, South Africa, Tanzania, Zambia, and Zimbabwe. Its natural habitat is dry savanna.

References

External links
 Purple indigobird - Species text in The Atlas of Southern African Birds.

purple indigobird
Birds of Sub-Saharan Africa
purple indigobird
Taxonomy articles created by Polbot